Stanislau Shcharbachenia (born 5 March 1985) is a Belarusian rower. He competed at four Olympic Games from 2004 to 2016.

References

External links 
 
 
 

1985 births
Living people
Olympic rowers of Belarus
Rowers at the 2004 Summer Olympics
Rowers at the 2008 Summer Olympics
Rowers at the 2012 Summer Olympics
Rowers at the 2016 Summer Olympics
Belarusian male rowers
World Rowing Championships medalists for Belarus
European Rowing Championships medalists
People from Babruysk
Sportspeople from Mogilev Region